Old State Capitol may refer to:

Old State Capitol (Milledgeville, Georgia), listed on the NRHP in Georgia
Iowa Old Capitol Building in Iowa City, Iowa
 Old Capitol (Indiana) in Corydon, Indiana
Old Louisiana State Capitol, Baton Rouge, LA, listed on the NRHP in Louisiana
Old State Capitol State Historic Site in Springfield, Illinois, a U.S. National Historic Landmark
Old State Capitol (Kentucky) in Frankfort, Kentucky, home to the Kentucky Historical Society
Old Mississippi State Capitol, Jackson, Mississippi, a U.S. National Historic Landmark also known as Old State Capitol

See also
Old State House (disambiguation)